Schwanneke is a German surname. Notable people with the surname include:

 Ellen Schwanneke (1906–1972), German dancer and actress
 Viktor Schwanneke (1880–1931), German director, writer, and actor

German-language surnames